Sarangkot is Ward 18 of Pokhara, Kaski District, Nepal, after it was merged into the city in 2015. It is a popular tourist destination for those who arrive in Pokhara. At the 1991 Nepal census it had a total population of 5,060 with 1,010 individual households.

The Ward is located on Sarangkot, a hill on the western side of Pokhara with an altitude of 1600m. Sarangkot is known for panoramic Himalayan views of Dhaulagiri, Annapurna and Manaslu. It also provides an expansive view of the city of Pokhara, from the extreme north to the south including the Phewa Lake. Tourists drive up the hill to watch the sunrise from the view tower at the top. In recent years, Sarangkot has been called one of the best paragliding locations in the world. The hike up from Pokhara Baglung highway at Miruwa to Sarangkot takes 90 minutes to 1.5hours.

Sarangkot has one community FM radio station called Radio Sarangkot. It broadcasts at 104.6 MHz.

Gallery

References

External links

UN map of the municipalities of Kaski District

Tourism in Nepal
Wards of Pokhara